Ben McCalman (born 18 March 1988 in Dubbo, New South Wales) is a former Australian rugby union footballer, playing for the Western Force in the international Super Rugby competition, and Australia.

McCalman attended the Kinross Wolaroi School in Orange. In 2005 and 2006 he made the Australian Schools selection. McCalman then furthered his education at Sydney University. He made his Western Force and Wallabies debuts in 2010 and was a part of the Australian 2011 Rugby World Cup campaign.

In 2015, McCalman signed a three-year flexible contract with the Australian Rugby Union, becoming just the second player to sign a flexible contract. The new deal allows him to play the 2015-16 season in Japan's Top League, whilst remaining with the Western Force until the end of the 2018 season.

Super Rugby statistics

References

External links
Wallabies profile
Western Force profile

1988 births
Australian rugby union players
Australia international rugby union players
Western Force players
Rugby union number eights
Sportsmen from New South Wales
Living people
Rugby union players from Sydney
Saitama Wild Knights players
Australian expatriate rugby union players
Australian expatriate sportspeople in Japan
Expatriate rugby union players in Japan